Tribejrutama Dhamrong (8 February 1881 – 22 November 1887) was a Prince of Siam (later Thailand). He was a member of the Siamese Royal Family. He was a son of Chulalongkorn.

Biography
Prince Tribejrutama Dhamrong was born on 8 February 1881, at Grand Palace, Bangkok. He was the 36th son of King Chulalongkorn, and the third son of the King and Queen Saovabha Phongsri (bestowed as Queen Sri Bajrindra, the Queen Mother in a later reign). After birth, his father gave him the full name as Tribejrutama Dhamrong Narisaravongs Devarajvarobhatojatbisudhi Ratanaburusaya Chulalongkorn Badindorndebayavaroros Adulyayosvisudhikrasatri Kattiyarajakumarn

He died on 22 November 1887, at age 6. He died 3 months after the death of his elder sister, Princess Bahurada Manimaya, and 6 months after his younger brother, Prince Siriraja Kakudhabhandh, who died on 31 May 1887.

Ancestry

1881 births
1887 deaths
19th-century Thai royalty who died as children
19th-century Chakri dynasty
Thai male Chao Fa
Children of Chulalongkorn
Sons of kings